The 1967 Greek legislative election was scheduled to occur on 28 May 1967. Because Georgios Papandreou's Center Union was favored to win (after having been dismissed by the king two years earlier, opening the Apostasia of 1965), a group of right-wing colonels instead launched a coup d'état on 21 April, preventing the elections from occurring and inaugurating the rule of the Greek junta dictatorship.

References

1967 Greek legislative election
1967 elections in Europe
Cancelled elections
May 1967 events in Europe